Southern tick-associated rash illness (STARI) is an emerging infectious disease related to Lyme disease that occurs in southeastern and south-central United States. It is spread by tick bites and it was hypothesized that the illness was caused by the bacteria Borrelia lonestari. However, there is insufficient evidence to declare this Borrelia strain as a causative agent.

Symptoms

Diagnosis is based on a circular "bull's-eye" rash at the site of infection called erythema chronicum migrans, which is very similar to that seen in Lyme disease. However, the symptoms of STARI are mild,  and resemble influenza, with fatigue, muscle pains, and headache. Fever is sometimes seen, but is not characteristic.

Causes
This illness is a tick-borne disease carried by the lone star tick Amblyomma americanum. This tick was first proposed as a possible vector of disease in 1984, and the illnesses associated with the tick called "Lyme-like disease", but it was not  recognized to be distinct from Lyme disease until the late 1990s.

Several studies have failed to detect Borrelia burgdorferi, which is the causative agent of Lyme disease, in patients from the southern United States. This disease may be caused by the related bacterium Borrelia lonestari, which is a spirochete first isolated in culture in 2004. However, this conclusion is controversial since the spirochete is not detected in all cases of the syndrome, which has led some authors to argue that the illness is not caused by a bacterial pathogen.

Treatment
Infections are treated with antibiotics, particularly doxycycline, and the acute symptoms appear to respond to these drugs.

Prognosis
No serious long-term effects are known for this disease, but preliminary evidence suggests, if such symptoms do occur, they are less severe than those associated with Lyme disease.

See also
Borrelia
Zoonosis

References

External links 

Southern Tick-Associated Rash Illness (STARI) Home Page Centers for Disease Control
STARI Fact Sheet Florida Department of Health
Southern Tick-Associated Rash Illness (STARI) SCWDS Briefs, January 2003, Vol.18, No.4

Bacterial diseases
Tick-borne diseases
Lyme disease
Spirochaetes